Millis-Clicquot is a census-designated place (CDP) in the town of Millis in Norfolk County, Massachusetts, United States. The population was 4,403 at the 2010 census. The name "Clicquot" comes from the now-defunct Clicquot Club Company, a beverage manufacturer that was founded in the area in 1881.

Geography
Millis-Clicquot is located at  (42.169045, -71.355159).

According to the United States Census Bureau, the CDP has a total area of 8.1 km (3.1 mi2), of which 3.1 mi2 (8.0 km) is land and 0.04 mi2 (0.1 km) of it (0.64%) is water.

Demographics

As of the census of 2000, there were 4,607 people, 1,860 households, and 1,231 families residing in the CDP. The population density was 570.1/km (1,476.3/mi2). There were 1,891 housing units at an average density of 234.0/km (606.0/mi2). The racial makeup of the CDP was 96.83% White, 1.02% Black or African American, 0.09% Native American, 1.17% Asian, 0.13% from other races, and 0.76% from two or more races. Hispanic or Latino of any race were 0.89% of the population.

There were 1,860 households, out of which 34.1% had children under the age of 18 living with them, 53.0% were married couples living together, 10.6% had a female householder with no husband present, and 33.8% were non-families. 28.5% of all households were made up of individuals, and 9.2% had someone living alone who was 65 years of age or older. The average household size was 2.46 and the average family size was 3.06.

In the CDP, the population was spread out, with 25.9% under the age of 18, 4.9% from 18 to 24, 35.7% from 25 to 44, 22.3% from 45 to 64, and 11.3% who were 65 years of age or older. The median age was 37 years. For every 100 females, there were 90.6 males. For every 100 females age 18 and over, there were 86.6 males.

The median income for a household in the CDP was $57,909, and the median income for a family was $64,750. Males had a median income of $51,238 versus $37,750 for females. The per capita income for the CDP was $27,483. About 4.6% of families and 4.0% of the population were below the poverty line, including 5.4% of those under age 18 and none of those age 65 or over.

References

Census-designated places in Norfolk County, Massachusetts
Census-designated places in Massachusetts